The Federal Correctional Institution, McDowell (FCI McDowell) is a medium-security federal prison for male offenders in southwestern West Virginia. It also has an adjacent satellite prison camp which houses minimum-security male offenders. It is operated by the Federal Bureau of Prisons, a division of the United States Department of Justice. It is located within the city limits of Welch, although it lies in a detached rural area about four miles north of the city center.

History
In the early 2000s, the Bureau of Prisons identified McDowell County, West Virginia, as a potential location for a new federal correctional facility. A panel of BOP officials held a hearing in 2004 to give residents the opportunity to register their opinions regarding the project. Two hundred residents attended the hearing and were nearly unanimous in their approval, citing the hundreds of jobs the construction project would provide. The project eventually employed approximately 100 contractors, who further boosted the local economy by patronizing local businesses. The facility was completed in 2010 at an approximate cost of $223 million. The first inmates to arrive were assigned to the minimum-security prison camp and were immediately put to work in maintenance jobs. However, in a July 2010 article, West Virginia Public Broadcasting reported that local people were not landing as many prison jobs as expected. Out of the first 87 hires, only 12 were from McDowell County and 5 from bordering Wyoming County.

Notable inmates (current and former)

See also 
List of U.S. federal prisons
Federal Bureau of Prisons
Incarceration in the United States

References

External links 
 Federal Correctional Institution, McDowell - Official website

Federal Correctional Institutions in the United States
McDowell County, West Virginia
Prisons in West Virginia
2010 establishments in West Virginia